Vladimír Tošovský (born 17 October 1961) is a Czech politician. He was the Minister of Industry and Trade in the caretaker government of Jan Fischer.

References

1961 births
Industry and Trade ministers of the Czech Republic
Living people
Czech Social Democratic Party Government ministers
Politicians from Prague
Czech Technical University in Prague alumni